Alberto Bottini (born 7 February 1967) is a Swiss freestyle swimmer. He competed in two events at the 1988 Summer Olympics.

References

External links
 

1967 births
Living people
Swiss male freestyle swimmers
Olympic swimmers of Switzerland
Swimmers at the 1988 Summer Olympics
Place of birth missing (living people)